Tjovitjo is a South African dance drama series. It follows the lives of pantsula dancers and how they navigate around the every day challenges of the township.

Plot 
Tjovitjo is a hyper-reality dance series set in the slums of Johannesburg. Tjovitjo is led by Mafred - played by Warren Masemol a- a thug and dancer with a past as a petty criminal, who is seeking the approval of his community.

The series spotlights sePantsula - a subculture and dance form that emerged in the 1950s, in the shadow of apartheid. Beneath the dirty street dance-offs, each episode Tjovitjo delves into contemporary issues that plague South Africa and the youth, such as unsafe abortion, zama-zama (illegal mining) and physical abuse.

Dance is what really what keeps this impoverished community sane but in the second season two dance is banned putting this very sanity to the test.

Amidst Mafred's poverty and struggle, a hardened Pantsula dance leader enters thug life and searches for redemption and salvation in his community.

Accolades

South African Film And Television (2019) 
 SAFTA Golden Horn (Winner)
Best Achievement in Directing - TV Drama Vincent Moloi

 SAFTA Golden Horn (Nominee)
Best TV Drama

 SAFTA Golden Horn (Nominee)
Best actor - TV Drama Warren Masemola

 SAFTA Golden Horn (Nominee)
Best Achievement in Editng - TV Drama

 SAFTA Golden Horn (Nominee)
Best Achievement In Art/ Design Production - TV Drama Vivienne Mahloko

 SAFTA Golden Horn (Nominee)
Best Achievement in Cinematography- TV Drama Motheo Moeng

South African Film And Television Awards, SAFTA (2018) 
 SAFTA Golden Horn (Winner)
Best actor - TV Drama Warren Masemola

 SAFTA Golden Horn (Winner)
Best TV Drama - Puo Pha Productions

 SAFTA Golden Horn (Winner)
Best Achievement in Editing - TV Drama Ikaye Masisi

 SAFTA Golden Horn (Winner)
Best Achievement In Art/ Design Production - Ephraim Mathula, Vivenne Mahloko

 SAFTA Golden Horn (Winner)
Best Achievement in Sound Design -TV Drama

 SAFTA Golden Horn (Winner)
Best Achievement in Cinematography - TV Drama Motheo Moeng, Marius Van Graan, Ofentse Mwase

 SAFTA Golden Horn (Nominee)
Best Achievement in Costume Design - TV Drama Charity Shirley Masonto

References

External links 
Netflix https://netflix.com/
Showmax https://www.showmax.com/
YouTube https://www.youtube.com/

2017 South African television series debuts
Television in Botswana